The Bulbous corpuscle or Ruffini ending or Ruffini corpuscle is a slowly adapting mechanoreceptor located in the cutaneous tissue between the dermal papillae and the hypodermis. It is named after Angelo Ruffini.

Structure
Ruffini corpuscles are enlarged dendritic endings with elongated capsules.

Function
This spindle-shaped receptor is sensitive to skin stretch, and contributes to the kinesthetic sense of and control of finger position and movement. They are at the highest density around the fingernails where they act in monitoring slippage of objects along the surface of the skin, allowing modulation of grip on an object. 

Ruffini corpuscles respond to sustained pressure and show very little adaptation.

Ruffinian endings are located in the deep layers of the skin, and register mechanical deformation within joints, more specifically angle change, with a specificity of up to 2.75 degrees, as well as continuous pressure states.  They also act as thermoreceptors that respond for a long time, so in case of deep burn there will be no pain, as these receptors will be burned off.

References

External links
 

Sensory receptors